This is an overview of the 2016 Iranian legislative election in Tehran, Rey, Shemiranat and Eslamshahr electoral district. In the election, all 30 seats were decided in the first round and went to Pervasive Coalition of Reformists: The Second Step.

Results

Notes and references

Parliamentary elections in Tehran
2010s in Tehran
2016 elections in Iran